Kyser is a surname. Notable people with the surname include:

Kay Kyser (1905–1985), American bandleader and radio personality
Kurt Kyser (1951-2017), Canadian mineralogist and geochemist
Michale Kyser (born 1991), American basketball player for Hapoel Holon in the Israeli Basketball Premier League

See also
Kaiser (disambiguation)
Keyser (disambiguation)
Kyser Lake